Eyes of the Mind is the fifth album and the fourth studio album by Casiopea, released in 1981. The album was recorded in Los Angeles.

Track listing
All Arranged by Casiopea and Harvey Mason except "Space Road" arranged by Kenny Mason.

Personnel
CASIOPEA are
Issei Noro - Electric Guitar (YAMAHA SG-2000 & SG-1000 Fretless)
Minoru Mukaiya - keyboards (Fender Rhodes 73, Roland VP-330, Prophet-5, Yamaha GS-1, Mini Moog, Polymoog, ARP 2600, Korg 800 DV, Korg Trident)
Tetsuo Sakurai - Bass (YAMAHA BB-2000)
Akira Jimbo - drums (YAMAHA YD-9000R)

Guest Players:
Harvey Mason - Percussion
Paulinho Da Costa - Percussion
 
Synthesizer arrangements for "Magic Ray", "Black Joke" and "Take Me" by Bob James.
Synthesizer programming for "Magic Ray", "Black Joke" and "Take Me" by Michael Boddicker.

Production
Producer - Harvey Mason
Associate Producer - Kenny Mason
Engineers - Peter Chaikin
Assistant Engineers - Terry Moore
Project Coordinators - Shunsuke Miyazumi, Hide katada
Art Direction and front cover illustration - Roland Young
Photographer - Dave Williams
Liner notes - Issei Noro
Remastering engineer - Kouji Suzuki (2016)

Chart performance

Release history

External links

References

1981 albums
Casiopea albums
Alfa Records albums